Sir Thomas Dacre (1410 – 15 January 1448) was born in Brampton, Cumberland, England.

Dacre's father was Thomas Dacre, 6th Baron Dacre and his mother was Philippa de Neville. He married Elizabeth Bowett, daughter of Sir William Bowett of Horsford and Amy de Ufford. Elizabeth was born 1405 in Horsfordburgh, St. Margaret's, Norfolk, England.

Children of Sir Thomas Dacre:
Phillipa Dacre, born in 1428 in Gilsland, Northumbria.
Joan Dacre, 7th Baroness Dacre, born c. 1433 at Gilsland, Northumbria.
Margaret Dacre, born 1431 in Gilsland, Northumbria.

Sources 
British History, Dacre

1410 births
1448 deaths
Heirs apparent who never acceded
Knights Bachelor
People from Brampton, Carlisle
Thomas Dacre